Georges Kern (born 25 January 1965) is a German-Swiss businessman, who is known being as CEO of Swiss watchmaker Breitling since 2017. He has studied Political Science in Strasbourg, France, and graduated in Business Administration from the University of St. Gallen, Switzerland. He acquired experience in the fast-moving-consumer-goods sector at Kraft Foods Switzerland before moving into the watch industry.

Career 
In 2000, he joined Richemont Group, the Swiss luxury goods group, and was active in the integration of the brands A. Lange & Söhne, Jaeger-LeCoultre and International Watch Company (IWC) following their acquisition.

In 2002, at the age of 36, he became the youngest CEO within Richemont when he was chosen to run IWC Schaffhausen. 

In 2017, he was promoted to Head of Watchmaking, Marketing and Digital at Richemont and focused on supervising the Specialist Watchmaking Maisons.

In 2017, Georges Kern was appointed the new CEO of the independent watch company Breitling SA, where he is also a shareholder. The British investment group CVC had acquired 80 percent of the shares in Breitling in April 2017, with 20 percent of the shares remaining in the hands of the brand's previous owners, the Schneider family, until November 2018 when these shares were also sold to CVC.  In his new position, Georges Kern's mission is to foster the global development of one of the world's most established watch manufacturers, and to focus on further developing Breitling's digital and retail footprint, in particular with a view to accelerating growth in the important Asian markets.

Georges Kern served as a member of the Young Global Leaders at the World Economic Forum from 2005 to 2010, and became Founding Curator of the Global Shapers Community in Zurich in 2011. He is currently a member of the Board of Directors of the Swiss American Chamber of Commerce.

Philanthropy 
Alongside his corporate objectives, Kern is also committed to a range of charitable causes. He was on the Board of Trustees of the Laureus Sport for Good Foundation, which helps young people to overcome their social problems through sport. Georges Kern was also a patron of the Fondation Antoine de Saint-Exupéry, Fondation Antoine de Saint-Exupéry pour la Jeunesse, which supports disadvantaged young people on their path to adulthood.
Georges Kern counts active climate protection among his corporate responsibilities. Upon his initiative, IWC has been certified as a carbon neutral company and Breitling has announced a partnership with Ocean Conservancy, a non-governmental organization dedicated to leading the global fight for a healthy ocean and clean beaches.

Works 
 Kern, Georges A. "Engineering the Intangible: Strategic Success Factors in the Luxury Watch Industry" (pages 153–180), Evolving Business Models. How CEOs Transform Traditional Companies, Springer International Publishing (2017) Editors: Franz, Christoph, Bieger, Thomas, Herrmann, Andreas (Eds.)

Film Production

Georges Kern realized one of his passions when he produced the French comedy My Dog Stupid, based on the cult novel by John Fante. It marked Kern's debut as a film producer and starred Yvan Attal along with Charlotte Gainsbourg, Ben Attal, Pascale Arbillot, Adèle Wismes, Pablo Venzal, Eric Ruf, and Sébastien Thiery. The film was released on October 31, 2019.

Further reading

Watch brands move business online to beat lockdown - Financial Times
"Letter: A fine mechanical watch will outlive its owner" - Financial Times
«Breitling ist vom Macho-Image weggekommen» - nzz
Interview de Georges Kern - Worldtempus
On the Road With Georges Kern of Breitling - New York Times
Georges Kern: «Breitling ne peut être cantonné à l'aviation» - Le Figaro
Raus aus der Nische: Georges Kern über die Zukunft von Breitling - Luxify
Inside Breitling s asia business strategy with CEO Georges Kern - Bloomberg
„Die Uhrenbranche spürt wieder Rückenwind“ - Handelsblatt
Georges Kern: CEO Breitling - GMT Mag
Breitling-CEO Kern: «Emotionalität bleibt, Visionen sind gefragt» - Finanz und wirtschaft

References 

Living people
1965 births
Businesspeople from Düsseldorf
University of St. Gallen alumni